The Sid Hutcheson Building is a historic commercial building at 13912 Arkansas Highway 5 (the northeast corner of Main Street) in the center of Norfork, Arkansas.  Built c. 1910, it is a vernacular two-story structure, built out of local stone and concrete.  The west-facing facade is dominated by a two-story porch extending the full width of the building.  The building is divided into three storefronts, which housed a grocery story, a Ford dealership, and a hotel, when it was completed.  It is one of six commercial buildings, and is representative of the community's growth after the arrival of the railroad in the early 20th century.

The building was listed on the National Register of Historic Places in 2014.

See also
National Register of Historic Places listings in Baxter County, Arkansas

References

Commercial buildings on the National Register of Historic Places in Arkansas
National Register of Historic Places in Baxter County, Arkansas
Commercial buildings completed in 1910
1910 establishments in Arkansas
Romanesque Revival architecture in Arkansas